Jarolím is a surname. Notable people with the surname include:

David Jarolím (born 1979), Czech footballer
Karel Jarolím (born 1956), Czech football coach and former international footballer
Lukáš Jarolím (born 1976), Czech football player
Marek Jarolím (born 1984), Czech football midfielder

See also
Jarolím Antal, leading Slovak expert on social etiquette, state and diplomatic protocol